Zeynep Oka (born 15 July 1966) is a Turkish sport shooter. She competed in rifle shooting events at the 1988 Summer Olympics.

Olympic results

References

1966 births
Living people
ISSF rifle shooters
Turkish female sport shooters
Shooters at the 1988 Summer Olympics
Olympic shooters of Turkey